Aniba megaphylla is a species of tree in the family Lauraceae and is native to South America. It is native to Bolivia, Brazil North, Colombia, Ecuador, French Guiana, Guyana, Peru, Suriname, and Venezuela, growing primarily in wet tropical biomes. This species produces the cytotoxic lignan megaphone.

References

External links

megaphylla

Trees of Peru
Trees of Bolivia
Trees of Venezuela
Trees of Ecuador
Trees of Brazil